Gorogobius stevcici (English name: Stevcic's goby) is a species of gobies in the family of Gobiidae, endemic to the coastal waters of the islands of São Tomé and Príncipe, where it occurs at depths from . The species was named and described by Kovačić and Schliewen in 2008. The fish grows to a maximum of 3.3 cm in length for males and 2.3 cm for females.

References 

stevcici
Fish described in 2008
Fish of the Atlantic Ocean
Fauna of São Tomé and Príncipe
Fauna of São Tomé Island
Ilhéu das Rolas